Matthew Smallwood, (born Middlewick 15 February 1614; died 26 April 1683), was Dean of Lichfield from 1671 until his death.

Smallwood was educated at Brasenose College, Oxford. He was Chaplain to Charles II and Canon of St Paul's. He held livings in the City of London (St Martin Orgar), Halsall and Gawsworth.

References

Alumni of Brasenose College, Oxford
Honorary Chaplains to the King
17th-century English Anglican priests
Deans of Lichfield
1614 births
1683 deaths